The Old Haa of Brough in located in Burravoe, Yell, Shetland, Scotland. Built for Robert Tyrie, a merchant, in 1672, houses the local museum for Burravoe and Yell. The archway with an armorial panel above, with Tyrie's initials and the year 1672, are the remains of an old courtyard.

On 19 January 1942, a Catalina aircraft crashed on the hill above Burravoe. Seven of her 10 passengers were killed, and one of the propellers can be seen outside the Old Haa Museum. 

There is a memorial to Bobby Tulloch at the museum.

Sources

 This article is based on http://shetlopedia.com/Old_Haa_Museum a GFDL wiki.

External links 
 The Old Haa

Yell, Shetland
Museums in Shetland
Local museums in Scotland
Buildings and structures completed in 1672
1672 establishments in Scotland
Biographical museums in Scotland
Natural history museums in Scotland